Interstate 190 (I-190) is a  auxiliary Interstate Highway in the US state of Massachusetts, maintained by the Massachusetts Department of Transportation (MassDOT). Spanning approximately  along a south–north axis, it is a spur route of I-90 (the Massachusetts Turnpike) in Central Massachusetts. However, its southern terminus exists at its split from I-290 in Worcester, which itself splits from the turnpike in Auburn. Its northern terminus lays at an interchange with Route 2 in Leominster.

Route description

The southern terminus of I-190 is in Worcester. Near the Greendale Mall, there is an interchange with Route 12 before the highway passes along the eastern shore of Indian Lake and continues through the northern points of Worcester. In West Boylston, I-190 has a second interchange with Route 12 before turning northwest into Holden. The freeway later crosses the Quinapoxet River and then curves to the northeast reentering West Boylston. I-190 intersects Route 140 and then intersects Route 12 once more in Sterling. There is an exit for Route 117 in Lancaster. North of Johnny Appleseed State Park and Lancaster Town Forest, I-190 reaches its northern terminus at Route 2 and Mechanic Street in the city of Leominster.

A portion of the highway was built with extra-wide shoulders, which are painted green, to prevent runoff from contaminating the nearby Wachusett Reservoir.

History

Exit list
All interchanges were to be renumbered to mileage-based numbers under a project scheduled to start in 2016. However, this project was postponed until November 18, 2019, when MassDOT confirmed that, beginning in late mid-2020, the exit renumbering project will begin. On March 12, 2021, MassDOT announced that the I-190 exit numbers will get renumbered for two days starting on March 21.

References

External links

History of I-190 MA at Boston Roads

90-1 Massachusetts
90-1
Transportation in Worcester County, Massachusetts
1 (Massachusetts)
Transportation in Worcester, Massachusetts